Jesper Sørensen (born 10 June 1973) is a Danish professional football coach and former player. He is currently manager of the Danish Superliga team Brøndby IF.

Career
Sørensen previously played football as a midfielder for FC Copenhagen, Ikast FS, AB and AGF.

In the summer of 2009, he became assistant coach at AGF – a position he held until 2013, when he became head coach of Silkeborg IF. However, after registering a record low number of points in the Superliga, Sørensen was sacked on 8 December 2014.

On 18 August 2021, he was announced as the new manager of the Danish under-21 national team, although he kept serving as the assistant coach at Brøndby IF until the end of the same year.

Under Sørensen's tenure, Denmark reached the qualification play-offs for the 2023 UEFA European Under-21 Championship, even though they eventually lost to Croatia over two legs. Despite that, in December 2022 the coach (as well as his assistant, Steffen Højer), renewed his contract with the Federation until 2024.

Just a month after renewing his contract, Sørensen left the Danish U-21 team to become manager of his former club Brøndby IF in January 2023.

Managerial statistics

References

External links
  Official Danish Superliga stats
  Danish national team profile
  Jesper Sørensen at Footballdatabase

1973 births
Living people
Danish men's footballers
Denmark under-21 international footballers
Denmark youth international footballers
Danish Superliga players
F.C. Copenhagen players
Ikast FS players
Aarhus Gymnastikforening players
Akademisk Boldklub players
Silkeborg IF managers
FC Fredericia managers
Association football midfielders
Danish football managers
Brøndby IF non-playing staff
Footballers from Aarhus
Brøndby IF managers